Wildside Press is an independent publishing company in Cabin John, Maryland, United States. It was founded in 1989 by John Betancourt and Kim Betancourt. While the press was originally conceived as a publisher of speculative fiction in both trade and limited editions, its focus has broadened since then, both in content and format.

Its website notes publication of works of mystery, romance, science fiction, fantasy, and nonfiction, as well as downloadable audiobooks and CDs, eBooks, magazines, and physical books. Wildside Press has published approximately 10,000 books through print on demand and traditional means.

Writers
The company has published work by a number of contemporary writers, including Lloyd Biggle Jr., Alan Dean Foster, Paul Di Filippo, Esther Friesner, S. T. Joshi, Ionuț Caragea, Paul Levinson, David Langford, Nick Mamatas, Brian McNaughton, Vera Nazarian, Paul Park, Tim Pratt, Stephen Mark Rainey, Alan Rodgers, Darrell Schweitzer, Lawrence Watt-Evans, and Chelsea Quinn Yarbro.

In addition to newer writers, the company works at keeping established older authors in print, such as James Branch Cabell, H. Rider Haggard, and Clark Ashton Smith, as well as lesser known scribes like R. A. Lafferty. The publisher has a specialty reprint project, reproducing old issues of such pulp magazines as The Phantom Detective, Secret Agent X, and The Spider.

Wildside Press has also published Robert E. Howard's ten book series called Weird Works, which comprises Howard's entire body of collected work published in the pulp magazine Weird Tales, and restored to the original magazine texts.

Imprints
 Borgo Press
 Cosmos Books
 Point Blank

Magazines

Current
 Adventure Tales
 Black Cat Mystery Magazine
 Sherlock Holmes Mystery Magazine
 Weirdbook

Defunct
 Cat Tales: The Magazine of Fantastic Feline Fiction
 H. P. Lovecraft's Magazine of Horror
 Strange Tales
 Underworlds: The Magazine of Noir and Dark Suspense
 Weird Tales

Ebooks
In addition to selling ebooks via its website and other booksellers', Wildside Press maintains a "Freebies" page on which it sells both permanent and weekly free selections. The weekly freebies are typically either "megapack" or "minipack" compilations.

References

External links

7 Question Interview with John Betancourt

American speculative fiction publishers
Book publishing companies based in Maryland
Role-playing game publishing companies
Science fiction publishers
Privately held companies based in Maryland
Publishing companies established in 1989